The grey-eared brushfinch or black-faced brushfinch (Atlapetes melanolaemus) is a species of bird in the family Passerellidae.

It is endemic to humid Andean forest from Cusco in Peru to La Paz in Bolivia.

It is sometimes considered a subspecies of the rufous-naped brushfinch. Despite the common names, its face is not blacker than in many of its relatives and the gray "ear" is often not easily visible. Overall it resembles the rufous-naped brushfinch, but with darker, more olive underparts and a black throat.

References

grey-eared brushfinch
Birds of the Peruvian Andes
Birds of the Bolivian Andes
grey-eared brushfinch
grey-eared brushfinch
grey-eared brushfinch
Taxonomy articles created by Polbot